Shon Boublil is a Canadian guitarist from Montreal who won the Grand Prize of Lee Ritenour 6 String Theory International Guitar Competition in 2010 making his  debut recording on the Six String Theory CD.

Biography 

In 2008 Shon Boublil was a finalist at the Canadian Music Competition winning the regional, provincial national. In 2009 Boublil was a finalist at the  Schwob Guitar Competition in Atlanta and the Grand Prix de Guitare de Montreal. The same year he won 1st place at the Montreal International Classical Guitar Competition.
In 2010 Boublil received the Grand Prize at the Six String Theory Competition in Santa Monica. His prize was a solo recording on the Six String Theory CD along with Lee Ritenour, B. B. King, George Benson, Steve Lukather, John Scofield, Pat Martino, Mike Stern, Neal Schon, Slash, Vince Gill, Keb Mo, Taj Mahal, Joe Bonamassa, Jonny Lang, Andy McKee, Guthrie Govan, Joe Robinson and Tomoyasu Hotei. Shon Boublil played two caprices by 19th Century Italian guitarist/ composer Luigi Legnani.
In 2011 Boublil was a semi-finalist at the Barrios WorldWideWeb Competition.

Shon Boublil is currently (2022) completing his Ph.D. in theoretical physics and education at the University of Western Australia under professor David Blair. Shon is also a member of the Ozgrav (Australian Gravitation Waves Discovery) team.

Discography 

Six String Theory
Shon Boublil Experiment Vol.1

References

External links 
Official website

1993 births
Living people
21st-century Canadian guitarists